Pish Baghan (also Romanized as Pīsh Bāghān; also known as Besh Bāghān) is a village in Shirin Darreh Rural District, in the Central District of Quchan County, Razavi Khorasan Province, Iran. At the 2006 census, its population was 110, in 25 families.

References 

Populated places in Quchan County